Caronia is a town in Italy.

Caronia may also refer to:

 , an ocean liner owned by Cunard Line 1904–1933
 , a combined ocean liner/cruise ship owned by Cunard Line 1948–1967
 , a cruise ship owned by Cunard Line 1999–2004 
 British Rail Class 40 diesel locomotive D219
 Giuseppe Caronia (1884–1977), Italian politician